Alice Santos Igitol is a Republican territorial Representative of the Northern Mariana Islands.

Santos Igitol successfully stood for election to the House of Representatives for Precinct 4 in 2016. She became one of only two female House representatives. She serves as the chair of the House Committee on Natural Resources.

References

Living people
Northern Mariana Islands women in politics
Members of the Northern Mariana Islands House of Representatives
21st-century American women politicians
21st-century American politicians
Republican Party (Northern Mariana Islands) politicians
Year of birth missing (living people)